Ann Biderman (born August 15, 1951) is an American film and television writer. She is the creator and executive producer of the NBC/TNT series Southland (2009–2013), and won an Emmy Award for Outstanding Individual Achievement in Writing in a Drama Series for an episode of NYPD Blue. She created, wrote, and produced the Showtime drama Ray Donovan.

Early years
Biderman grew up in Florida and New York. When she was sixteen, she attended boarding school at The Stockbridge School, in the Berkshire Mountains in Massachusetts, where she was very interested in the arts.

Biderman and her sister spent much of their youth in the company of writers, artists and musicians when living at the Chelsea Hotel in New York, where “Leonard Cohen was the boy next door” and her mother Peggy Biderman's home in Miami was a sort of halfway house for civil rights activists recently out of prison. Filmmaker Harry Everett Smith and poet Allen Ginsberg were close family friends.

Biderman lived for most of the 1980s with French filmmaker Roger Vadim.

Career
Biderman adapted the novel Smilla's Sense of Snow into the screenplay of the 1997 movie.

In the 2008-09 television season, Biderman developed the police drama series Southland, which aired as a midseason replacement for NBC. The series focuses on patrol officers and detectives in South Los Angeles.

Biderman wrote the pilot episode, and served as an executive producer for the first season alongside John Wells and Christopher Chulack. She wrote the episodes "Mozambique," "See the Woman," "Sally in the Alley" (with consulting producer Angela Amato Velez) and "Derailed."

Southland was renewed for a second season and Biderman remained an executive producer and writer. NBC reversed the decision and cancelled Southland after six episodes had been produced. The series was then picked up by the TNT network, and the previously-produced episodes were aired as the show's second season. Biderman co-wrote the second-season premiere "Phase Three" with Wells and wrote the episode "U-Boat."

TNT renewed the series for a third season but dramatically reduced its production budget. Biderman stepped down as executive producer but remained an executive consultant. She co-wrote the third-season premiere "Let It Snow" with Wells.

Biderman created the Showtime series Ray Donovan in 2013. She served as showrunner during the first season, and wrote several episodes, including the pilot. After the second season, Biderman stepped down as showrunner.

Filmography
Screenplays

Production staff

Writer

References

External links 

1951 births
American television writers
American women television writers
Place of birth missing (living people)
American women screenwriters
Living people
Primetime Emmy Award winners
Showrunners
Screenwriters from Florida
American women television producers
21st-century American women writers